Cedar Lake is a lake just north of Lake Winnipegosis in Manitoba, Canada. Cedar Lake's water level is controlled by the Grand Rapids dam. The town of Grand Rapids and the First Nations town of Easterville are nearby.

The lake is known to have excellent examples of prehistoric amber fossil of cretaceous age. This type of amber is called as "Chemawinit", according to an Indian tribe which lives in this area. Another name of this amber is "Cedarit". This amber contains many organic inclusions. To date, these inclusions have not been thoroughly researched.

The lake's main source is the Saskatchewan River, which forms a delta on the northwest side of the lake. The flow of the Saskatchewan River to Lake Winnipeg on the eastern end of Cedar Lake is regulated by the Grand Rapids dam built in 1962 by Manitoba Hydro.

See also 
Saskatchewan River Delta
List of lakes of Manitoba

References 

Lakes of Manitoba
Hudson's Bay Company trading posts
Saskatchewan River